Nuray Mert, (born 1960 in Trabzon, Turkey) is a Turkish columnist and political scientist. She is a columnist for Hürriyet Daily News. Mert is also a Bilderberg participant.

Academic career
After graduating from Feyziye Mektepleri Işık College, she studied political science and history at Boğaziçi University, Istanbul, where she obtained the master's degree on a thesis entitled Prens Sabahaddin ve Terakki Mecmuası ("Prens Sabahaddin and Terakki Magazine"), and the doctorate on a thesis entitled Erken Cumhuriyet Döneminde Laik Düşünce ("Secular Thought in the Early Republican Period"). She worked for some time as a research assistant at Boğaziçi University, after which she became lecturer at the Department of Economics of Istanbul University.

In 2012–2013, she was an International Scholar in Residence at the Stanford Humanities Center.

Journalism
She used to host a TV show, but this was dropped after Turkish Prime Minister Recep Tayyip Erdoğan publicly criticized her. She was also fired on February 19, 2012, from her job as a columnist for the daily newspaper Milliyet. Mert has said that she now fears for her personal safety.

The Turkish Journalists' Association has denounced the attacks on Mert by Erdoğan.

In August 2017, Mert was fired from the newspaper Cumhuriyet after writing an article questioning the validity of evolution and another one in support of muftis performing marriages.

References

Turkish political scientists
Living people
1960 births
People from Trabzon
Boğaziçi University alumni
Academic staff of Istanbul University
Turkish women journalists
Turkish women writers
Milliyet people
Women political scientists